Onnu Muthal Poojyam Vare is a 1986 Indian Malayalam-language drama film produced by Navodaya Appachan under Navodaya Studio, written and directed by Reghunath Paleri in his directorial debut. The film features Asha Jayaram and Geethu Mohandas in lead roles. Mohanlal's voice-over appears throughout the film, but he appears only at the end of the story. Suresh Gopi and Mukesh makes cameo appearances.

The film explores the loneliness of a widow and the need of a father figure for her daughter. The film won six Kerala State Film Awards for Best Debut Director (Reghunath Paleri), Best Child Artist (Geethu), Best Cinematography (Shaji N. Karun), Best Editor (Shekhar), Best Art Director, and Best Sound Recordist.

Plot

The film sheds light on the story of Aleena (Asha Jayaram), a widow and her four-year-old daughter Deepamol (Geethu Mohandas). Aleena lives with her daughter treasuring the memories of her late husband (Prathap Pothan) in a big house. She repeatedly dismisses the notion of remarriage. She is a painter and works in the advertising industry. Deepamol is a bubbly little girl always playing around with the telephone making random calls. One such call turns their life forever when Deepamol gets in contact with her "Telephone uncle" (Mohanlal). Deepamol gets attached to Telephone uncle very fast. Though Aleena was on the fence and skeptical of the man's intentions, she eventually falls in love. Telephone uncle resists the coercions from the mother and never reveals his name or whereabouts. Finally, he comes to their place on the night of Deepamol's birthday raising Aleena's hope for a better life, only to put an end to it within a very short time.

Cast 
 Asha Jayaram as Aleena
 Geethu Mohandas as Deepamol
 Nedumudi Venu as Dr. K. K. Menon
 Sukumari as Sister
 Shari as Elizabeth, Aleena's friend
 Prathap Pothan as Josekutty, Aleena's late husband
 Zainuddin as the Santa Claus
 Kalabhavan Rahman as the icecream parlour waiter
 Suresh Gopi as the man at the beach (Cameo appearance)
 Mukesh as the man at the ice cream parlour (Cameo appearance)
 Mohanlal as Telephone uncle (Cameo appearance)

Production
Geethu Mohandas who was barely four years old made her acting debut as child artist with this film. In order to make her perform to the character, the film's director Paleri used to converse with her through telephone as Mohanlal's character to make her get familiarize with the character.

Soundtrack

Awards

References

External links
 
 Onnu Muthal Poojyam Vare at the Malayalam Movie Database

1980s Malayalam-language films
Films scored by Mohan Sithara
1986 drama films
1986 films
Indian drama films
Films produced by Navodaya Appachan